"Lone Star State of Mine" is an unreleased song by American actor, singer and songwriter River Phoenix. The lyrics and musical composition are attributed to Phoenix. The song was performed by Phoenix in the film The Thing Called Love (1993), but was not included on the soundtrack album for the film.

Background and history
Phoenix expressed his wishes to release music for a film with his band Aleka's Attic, but the group disbanded in early 1992.

Phoenix began writing songs for the film in July 1993. Commenting on the musical direction, Phoenix said, "The music has everything to do with me having the best understanding of the character and the movie".

In August 1993, Phoenix described "Lone Star State of Mine": "It originated from deep emotion and solitude and many days of being alone and in LA and a lot of childhood memories. It's an ode to solitude and preservation of one's independence and I guess, self-confidence."

In an August '93 issue, journalist Malissa Thompson from Seventeen described his singing as sounding amazingly urgent and sweet, although underscored with anger.

References

1993 songs